The Phantom Surfers are a surf rock band formed in 1988.

Members

Current (latest album)

"Swell" Mel Bergman: guitar
Mike "Mouth" Lucas: bass
Maz "Spazz" Kattuah: guitar
Russell "Junky Johnny" Quan: drums
Johnny "Big Hand" Bartlett: guitar

Previous

Johnny "Big Hand" Bartlett: guitar
Mel "Frostbite" Bergman: guitar
Michael "Daddy Love" Lucas: bass
Maz "Tender Pants"/"Good Knievel" Kattuah: drums
Trent Ruane: rhythm guitar and organ on Big-Screen Spectaculars LP
Fred again

First

Johnny "Big Hand" Bartlett: guitar
Mel "Frostbite" Bergman: guitar
Michael "Daddy Love" Lucas: bass
Danny Seelig: drums

Discography

Albums

Eighteen Deadly Ones! LP

(Norton Records, 1992)
Pleasure Point
20,000 Leagues Under the Surf
San Onofre
Horror Beach
Monster From The Surf
Sewer Peak
Surfin' With The Vy
Legend Of The Phantom Surfer
Wave Hog
Palincar
Sandtrap Stomp
Slots O'Fun
Stiletto
14 Miles To Gotham
Theme From Dead West
Twist Off
Jalama Burger
Banzai Run

Phantom Surfers Play The Songs Of The Big-Screen Spectaculars LP

(Estrus, 1992)
Bikini Drag
Pursuit of the Leather Girls
Geronimo
L'Ultima Volta
Hush, Hush Sweet Charlotte
Batwoman vs. Ratfink
High Wall
Bali Hai
Big Screen Spectacular Tonight
Eaffin' and Surfin'
Gammera
The Beach Girls and The Monster
Suffer
Popcorn

The Exciting Sounds Of Model Road Racing LP

(Lookout! Records, 1995. Re-edited in 1998)
Introduction
Everybody Up
Death O A Rookie
Schlock Slot
Slotter On 10th Avenue
Crossover Tragedy
Rheostat Rock
Pacific Shores
A Slot Car Named Desire
Turn Marshal
Stumps Of Mystery
Endurance Rally
Final Lap
"Church Key"

...And Dick Dale LP

(Crown Records, 1996)
Stop That Cedric
Tell Tale Couch
Rochambeau
Tic-Toc Rock
Battle of Little Big Hand
Skirfir
Fairest of Them All
Wow!
The Lonely Mattress
Gas Chamber
Try To Hide Me
Pretty Little Lisa
Sloth in
We'll Never Hear The End of It

The Great Surf Crash Of '97 LP

(Lookout! Records, 1997)
The Great Surf Crash Of '97
Rootin' Around For Ramona
Pygmy Dance
Basset Ballet
Single Whammy
The Cat Came Back
Ticker Tape jungle
Medley X-Files / Stupid Files
Ants In My Pants
(I Call My Baby) D.D.T.
Holiday Harbor
Babalou
Buy High, Sell Low
Yozora No Hoshi
Out The Window
No Go Diggy-Di
Lancelot Link Wray

Skaterhater LP, featuring Davie Allan

(Lookout! Records, 1998)
Curb Job (Skaterhater Overture)
Sidewalk City
Devil Dust
Sheena Was A Punk Rocker
You Meet The Nicest People On A Harley
Supercycle (Love Theme From Skaterhater)
The End Of A Skater
Blues Theme (Vocal)
Grindhouse
(The Sound Of) Breaking Glass
Arrow Space
Skate And Bait
Murder Can Be Fun
Polyurethane
Drag Run

XXX Party LP

(Lookout! Records, 2000)
I Know It When I Hear It
Dick Hickeys
The Pioneers/Have A Good Funeral/Yellow Neck Will Pay
The Golden Turd
Nantucket Sleigh Ride
Necro Sue
The Crepitation Contest
Tomato Juice
The Big Dick Club
Peach Pousaye
Dolemite's Corner
Happiness Is...
The Phantom Surfers' Alphabet
Business Deal
Love Is...
A Funny Thing Happened To Me On The Way To The Orgy
Sin In The Suburbs
Special Guest Guffaws (featuring America's Funnyman Neil Hamburger)
Let's Fist Again
Summa Pornographica

A Decade Of Quality Control 1988-1999

(V8 Records/Secret Recipe, 2000. Contains written history of the band)
Phantom Surfers Quality Statement
The Hearse/ El Aguila
Paradise Cove
Skating Red Square
Six Pack
Gypsy Surfer
Lafayette
Klingons Vs. Daleks
Surfari
Move It
Besame Mucho
Playa Raton
Flutterfoot
Shaving Cream
Poison Clam
Tie Me Kangaroo Down

EPs
Orbitron 7" (Estrus, 1991)

Singles
Besame Mucho 7" (Standard Recordings, 1991)
Unknown Museum Stomp 7" (Sympathy For The Record Industry, 1992)
Bikini Drag 7" (Estrus, 1992)
Flutter Foot 7" (Drop-Out, 1993)
Survival Of The Fattest 7" (Planet Pimp Records, 1995)
Istanbul 7" (Lookout! Records, 1996)
Banzai Washout 7" (Estrus)

Splits
Northwest Budget Rock Massacre 7" (The Phantom Surfers / Mummies)(Pre B.S. Records, 1991)
Hell-Beach Party 7" (The Phantom Surfers / The Roofdogs)(Demolition Records, 1992)
Rocket To Surfin' Europe Tour 1994 7" (The Phantom Surfers / The Astronauts) (Pin Up Records, 1994)
Go! (The Phantom Surfers / The Tormentos) (Scatter/Lost Tiki, 2003)
Parrillada con Amigos (The Phantom Surfers / The Beach Breakers) (ATMC Records, 2012)

Compilations
The Estrus Half-Rack 3x7"-box (Estrus, 3 7"-box1991)
The Estrus Half-Rack (Estrus, 1991)
Ultra Punch Deluxe 7" (Cruddy Records, 1993)
Turban Renewal: A Tribute To Sam The Sham & The Pharaohs (Norton Records, 2 LPs 1994)
Locked In To Surf & Rock 'n Roll Instrumentals (LP: Alopecia! Records, 1994; CD:Alopecia! Records, 1995)
Heide Sez (Lookout! Records, 1996)
You're Only As Good As The Last Thing You Did (Lookout! Records, 1997)
Forward Till Death (Lookout! Records, 1999)
The Necessary Effect, Screamers Songs Interpreted (Extravertigo Recordings/Xeroid Records, 2 CDs, 2003)
Instro-Mental Mania (AlphaMonic, 2004)
Fuck You Spaceman! 7" (Planet Pimp Records, 2004)
Everybody's Surfing/Nobody's Surfing LP (Repent Records)
Blood Orgy Of The Leather Girls Soundtrack LP (Planet Pimp Records)
Cowabunga! The Box Set (Rhino Records/Rhino Song Banzai Run, 4 CDs)

Notes

External links
Official website (under construction)
MySpace.com account
Phantom Surfers Interview In Horror Garage

Surf music groups
Rock music groups from California
Musical groups from San Francisco